Oberlienz is a municipality in the district of Lienz in the Austrian state of Tyrol.

Population

References

External links

 Outdoor Museum Oberlienz - Tyrol - Austria
 Old maps of Oberlienz

Cities and towns in Lienz District